Sentry (Robert "Bob" Reynolds) is a superhero appearing in American comic books published by Marvel Comics. Created by Paul Jenkins and Jae Lee, with uncredited conceptual contributions by Rick Veitch, the character first appears in The Sentry #1 (September 2000).

Publication history

Creation 
In the late 1990s, Paul Jenkins and Rick Veitch developed an idea by Jenkins' about "an over-the-hill guy, struggling with an addiction, who had a tight relationship with his dog" into a proposal for Marvel Comics' Marvel Knights line. Jenkins conceived of the character "a guardian type, with a watchtower", and came up with the name "Sentry" (after previously considering "Centurion"). Veitch suggested that the character could be woven into the history of the Marvel Universe, with versions of the character from the 1940s depicted in artistic styles matching the comics of each period. Veitch also suggested that due to some cataclysmic event, all recollection of the Sentry would have been removed from everyone's memory (including his own). Jenkins and Veitch decided that they would create not only a fictional history for the Sentry within the Marvel Universe, but also a fictional publication history in the real world, complete with imaginary creators ("Juan Pinkles" and "Chick Rivet", anagrams of Paul Jenkins and Rick Veitch). Jenkins pitched the concept to Marvel Knights editor Joe Quesada. Quesada decided to commission a miniseries written by Jenkins with art by Jae Lee, with whom Jenkins had previously worked on an Inhumans miniseries.

Publication 
The Sentry was first introduced in his 2000 eponymous Marvel Knights miniseries written by Paul Jenkins with art by Jae Lee. The miniseries ran for five issues and then segued directly into a series of flashback one-shots in which the Sentry teamed up with the Fantastic Four, Spider-Man, Angel of the X-Men, and the Hulk. These one-shots led to The Sentry vs. the Void, an additional one-shot that wrapped up the story of the miniseries and one-shots. In 2005, writer Brian Michael Bendis reused the Sentry by making him a member of the New Avengers. The Sentry played a minor role in the first arc, Breakout (issues #1–6), and was the focus of the second arc, The Sentry (issues #7–10) : Jenkins himself was featured as a character in the second one. Also in 2005, the Sentry received another miniseries, written by Paul Jenkins and drawn by John Romita, Jr., which ran for eight issues. The Sentry appeared in The Mighty Avengers as a member of that team, and later in Dark Avengers in a similar capacity, and as protagonist in The Age of the Sentry miniseries. He appeared as a regular character in the Dark Avengers series from issue #1 (March 2009) until the time of his death in the Siege limited series.

On March 6, 2018, it was announced that the character would be given an ongoing series written by Jeff Lemire and with art by Joshua Cassara and Kim Jacinto. The series ended after five issues.

Fictional character biography

Sentry and the Marvel Universe

Middle-aged, overweight Bob Reynolds remembers that he is Sentry, a superhero whose "power of one million exploding suns" is derived from a special serum. Realizing that his archenemy the Void is returning, Reynolds seeks out several prominent Marvel characters to warn them and to discover why no one remembers the Sentry.

The characters' memories of the Sentry and the Void resurface when Reynolds talks with them. The Sentry had taught Angel how to conquer his fear of falling. Peter Parker's photograph of the Sentry earned him a Pulitzer Prize and fame. Hulk had never forgotten the Sentry, whom he called "Golden Man". Under the Sentry's influence, Hulk had been a force for good which had redeemed his violent actions and won the adoration of the public. Mister Fantastic remembered the Sentry was his best friend and that the Fantastic Four had teamed up with him on many adventures. Meanwhile, the general public gradually came to remember the Sentry, as did Reynolds' old sidekick, Billy Turner who was formerly known as the Scout (now scarred and missing a forearm, due to an attack from the Void).

During the course of his investigation, Reynolds and Mister Fantastic discovered what had happened: as the Void had threatened the Earth, the heroes learned that the Sentry and the Void were two halves of the same person. In order to save the world, Robert Reynolds erased his memory from the mind of nearly every person on Earth, even his own. As the heroes stood along the United States' East Coast, united against the coming Void, Reynolds realized that he had to make the sacrifice again. With the help of his mechanical servant CLOC, Mister Fantastic, and Doctor Strange, Reynolds erased the Sentry from the world's memories once more. However, in the final panels of the final one shot, it's left ambiguous as to whether or not Reynolds actually remembers who he is despite Richards' and Strange's work.

Avengers
Reynolds reappears inside the supervillain prison the Raft, voluntarily imprisoned for murdering his wife Lindy Lee. Electro shuts down the security system, causing a massive jail break in which 42 villains escape. Several of the escaping villains are caught, while Matt Murdock is entering to talk to the Sentry. The Sentry defends several other characters from Carnage, whom he flies to space and rips in half.

Eventually, the Avengers learn that Mastermind, under the direction of an enemy of the Sentry known only as the General, implanted a psychic "virus" in Reynolds' mind that created delusions and the existence of the Void, which is actually Reynolds' repressed persona. The virus impairs Reynolds' ability to remember his life accurately, and, as a cry for help, he subconsciously implants his memories into the mind of comic book writer Paul Jenkins, who then transferred those memories to comic books. The Avengers track him down and show him that his wife, who he confessed to murdering, is alive and well. The Sentry flees, and he finds himself waking up in the small suburban house he shares with Lindy. His appearance has changed in an instant, and he appears to be living the life of an ordinary man. But the Avengers have tracked him down again, and, with the support of The Fantastic Four, the X-Men, the Inhumans, Namor, Doctor Strange, and S.H.I.E.L.D., they confront and attempt to reason with him. But Robert tearfully insists that the Void is coming, who will destroy them all, and that he can't help it. The Void arrives, a separate entity from Robert, and it takes on several different monstrous forms as it attacks. Though a vicious battle ensues, no one is actually killed. As they are still having their dialogue, and start getting through to him, the Void slows down to a stop. Finally, the powerful telepath Emma Frost is able to release Reynolds from the virus and restore his memories, and the Sentry joins the Avengers. The world in general, however, does not regain their memories of the Sentry or the Void. In an astounding coincidence, or twist of fate, the Sentry's Watchtower appears atop Stark Tower, where it had been all along. "Guess I was hiding it as part of my crazy," Robert explains.

The Sentry, returned as a hero, captures the hearts of the public while newspapers refer to him as "the Golden Guardian of Good", and he saves hundreds of lives on a daily basis.

Reynolds' psychological problems, however, have worsened. Unable to reconcile that Robert Reynolds, the Sentry, and the Void are the same being, the Sentry contains the Void in a vault in the Watchtower. At CLOC's urging, Reynolds' psychiatrist Dr. Cornelius Worth enters the vault and finds only a chair and a mirror. Dr. Worth realizes that the Void is not imprisoned at all. Later, during an office visit, Cornelius confronts Robert with this fact, showing him newspaper articles that indicate that the Sentry's heroic exploits are seemingly balanced in equal measure to other horrific deeds committed by the Void. Dr. Worth asked Robert to manifest the Sentry, so he can speak to him, but Robert refuses. Reynolds becomes angry and confused, changing forms back and forth between the Sentry and the Void,  before leaping through (and breaking) an office window. Dr. Worth follows Robert, finding him at the fairgrounds where he first gained his powers. The fairgrounds have been destroyed, and all the patrons evacuated, running out screaming.

Dr. Worth confronts Reynolds, who is holding a gun, and Reynolds warns the doctor to leave. Dr. Worth is undeterred, asking Reynolds to put the gun away, advising that he knows that Reynolds, despite his actions as the Void, is still trying to do good. Reynolds then simultaneously manifests both his Sentry and Void personas, who split into two separate entities. Notably, when the Void peels back his pitch black mask, his face is that of Robert Reynolds. Reynolds tells Dr. Worth that he was always the Void, indicating that the Void is actually Reynold's true persona, and describes the Sentry as a separate entity. Having revealed his deepest secret to Dr. Worth, Reynolds (still in his Void persona and holding a gun to Dr Worth's head), tells him that he must kill him now. Holding the gun just inches away from Dr. Worth's temple, Reynolds mockingly asks the Sentry if he is faster than a bullet. And with that he pulls the trigger and fires the gun at Dr. Worth.

After a bright muzzle flash, Dr. Worth notices that he is still alive, and the Sentry, having seemingly remained still, opens his hand to reveal the fired bullet. The Sentry chides Reynolds that he knew Sentry was fast enough to stop the bullet from reaching Dr. Worth's head and that the entire ploy was in vain, with Reynolds never intending to hurt Dr Worth after all. Reynolds dons the Void's black mask/visage, and accuses the Sentry of lying, declaring at first that Sentry isn't real, and then ranting that Sentry is the true manifestation of Robert Reynolds. The Sentry, addressing the Void as Robert, points out that Robert created the Sentry to tell no lies, and further clarifies that Robert hired Dr Worth so that he could bring his secret out in the open to justify destroying the world. The Void then attacks the Sentry, and the two fly up into the sky.

As Dr. Worth is watching the two entities fight in the air, the Sentry appears standing behind him, with cuts and bruises on his face and no further sign of The Void. The Sentry explains to Dr. Worth that Reynolds hired him because he subconsciously wanted someone to reveal that he is the Void to the world, so he would no longer have to hide that truth. Dr. Worth asked the Sentry if he too is Robert Reynolds, but the Sentry advised that he is merely an aspect of Robert. Cornelius then asked him to clarify which of the two aspects (The Void or the Sentry) is the real Robert Reynolds. The Sentry explained that neither he, nor the Void, represent the entirety of Robert Reynolds, as the two aspects do not even share memories. Sentry then tells Dr. Worth how Reynolds really gained his powers as a teenager: by stealing the Professor's serum and ingesting it to get high. He also pretended to be insane, knowing all along that the Void was never really in the Watchtower's vault, so that Robert Reynolds would keep the Void dormant, and also not wipe Sentry from existence. Dr. Worth tells the Sentry that he is not sure if Robert Reynolds can still do that. The Sentry then bids Dr Worth farewell, telling him that he's going to seek out help to answer his existential questions.

The Sentry then flies off and meets up with Doctor Strange. Doctor Strange uses his magic to peer into Sentry's memories and his life force. Doctor Strange finds that Sentry's life force is incomplete. While Strange and Sentry dialogue, a third voice can be heard speaking – though only the Sentry can hear it. The third voice tells Sentry that he is not real, and that he does not exist. Doctor Strange, oblivious to the third voice, peers deeper into the Sentry's memories, and reveals that even the Sentry's own understanding of his origins are flawed. Doctor Strange finally uncovers a deep memory of a secret fortress-like building, that Sentry recognizes as the Professor's base of operations. Doctor Strange, suddenly overcome by panic and fear, shuts down the magic mind probe and begs the Sentry not to pursue this any further.

The Sentry determines to seek out the base revealed in Doctor Strange's magic mind probe, as he can still hear the third voice telling him that "none of this is real". Before Sentry embarks on his journey, he returns to Dr. Cornelius Worth's home, posting Watchdog to guard the doctor's family and Lindy Lee, who is present at the home as well. Sentry wonders if he is truly Lindy Lee's husband, as he may not be the true Robert Reynolds. Dr. Worth begs Sentry to heal his sick daughter, who is in a catatonic state. Sentry declines his request, citing that if he showed preference for Dr. Worth's daughter, he would ethically have to do this for everyone. Sentry sets off to find the base and, after a short moment, Dr. Worth's daughter comes out of her catatonic state and speaks to her father – shocking the doctor, who realizes that Sentry had healed her anyhow.

The Sentry finds the base in his memories, but it is destroyed. As he enters, the third voice in his mind grows louder and louder, telling him that none of this is real, that he is a murderer, and that he is not a hero. As he enters the base, the Sentry suddenly finds himself sitting in locked, padded room, frothing at the mouth, and in a straitjacket. Suddenly, a man's voice through a loud speaker tells him that he is a mental patient who has undergone shock therapy and has awakened from a deep slumber, and that his name is John Victor Williams.

Sentry is told that his memories are false, and that he is, in fact, a crazed patient who brutally killed his next door neighbor, Melinda Jensen – whom the Sentry at first recognized as his wife Lindy Lee. After a time, the Sentry seemingly accepts this new version of reality, believing himself to possibly be John Victor Williams, and a prisoner in a psychiatric care facility. The Professor is at the facility, treating him as his doctor. Sentry, now appearing in the body and form of Robert Reynolds, manifests aspects of his old memories, which the Professor dismisses as part of his delusions. Eventually, Sentry realizes that this version of reality is entirely a false mental construct, and that in reality he is strapped to a table, locked in a machine that is keeping him sedated and implanting these false memories. Sentry breaks out of the machine, and sees that he is deep inside the base he had sought out – which turned out to be a secret S.H.I.E.L.D. facility. Nick Fury is present, as is the Professor and Doctor Strange, who was revealed to be the author of the false mental constructs. Doctor Strange tries to explain that he was doing this for Sentry's own good, but Sentry refuses to hear it. He grabs the Professor, begging for an explanation. The Professor reveals that he has a thermo-nuclear device implanted inside him that will detonate if he reveals the true secret of Sentry's origin. When the Professor decides to tell him, Nick Fury activates the bomb, forcing Sentry to fly the Professor up into the stratosphere. Before the Professor detonates, he tells Sentry to seek out the Void in Antarctica, advising that the Void knows the truth. The Professor dies in the explosion, and the Sentry heads back to Earth, heading for Antarctica.

In a final battle at the Void's base in Antarctica (which he calls the 'Hidey-hole' ... the opposite of the Watchtower, just as COLC, its 'Computer for Obliterating Life Completely', is the opposite of CLOC), the Void claims that Reynolds had actually ingested a super-saturated, exponentially more potent version of the Super-Soldier formula that created Captain America. This was considered dangerous by the government because Sentry's blood could be used to create more of the serum, enough for the entire world. Several failed attempts were made to kill him. Enraged by this revelation, the Sentry throws the Void into the Sun, telling his enemy that he no longer needs him to balance his own actions of good. The Void promises to return.

Next, Yelena Belova attacks the Avengers and absorbs the Sentry's powers. After Belova defeats each of the Avengers, she is defeated by the manifestation of the Void, which envelops and incapacitates her. The Sentry tells Belova that absorbing his powers has exposed her to the Void, but if she answers his questions, he can send the Void away.

The U.S. government sends Sentry to apprehend Iron Man, who has been mind-controlled to assassinate a number of high-profile former terrorists. Unable to find any physical weaknesses or outrun the Sentry, Iron Man attacks the Sentry's mind; he remotely hacks CLOC and has Sentry barraged with unfiltered warnings about multiple devastating disasters occurring simultaneously throughout the world. Unable to prioritize which alarm to deal with first, Sentry collapses to the ground in tears, utterly incapacitated.

Civil War

The Sentry sides with Iron Man's Pro-Registration program. He has been seen in a promotional poster labeled "Civil War: The Final Battle," again on Iron Man's side. He accompanies a S.H.I.E.L.D. squad to battle Wolverine and tells him that he doesn't want to get involved but sees no choice; he claims he has to stop the ugly business even if that means becoming part of it for a while. He then knocks Wolverine unconscious and hands him over to S.H.I.E.L.D.

Trying to escape from the battle, believing that every path he can choose will ultimately lead to the death of people he knows (one of his thoughts at this point consists of himself and Hulk triumphantly returning to Earth and 'ending' the war via killing all the heroes), Sentry retreats to the moon, where he is confronted by the Inhumans living there. Believed a threat, he is ordered to follow them to Black Bolt's presence. Then after a discussion of the Civil War events with the (still unaware) Inhumans, he rekindles his friendship with them and almost resumes his past relationship with Crystal. He is then confronted by Iron Man himself who finally convinces a still reluctant Sentry to join him.

It is stated that the Sentry publicly announces his support of the Registration Act three days after the climactic battle of the Civil War limited series.

Mighty Avengers
The Sentry is recruited by Tony Stark to be part of the Mighty Avengers, the newest incarnation of the Avengers team. While at first there is some dispute between the Sentry and his wife, Robert joins the team while Tony Stark and Ms. Marvel offer him assistance to battle his mental issues. He is described to be the most powerful member of the team, but lacks proper training on how to use his abilities, usually apologizing for his mistakes (apologizing for damage to a building and being thrown into a blimp).

In the battle against the female Ultron, the two prove to be evenly matched. Neither is able to win until Ultron uses a virus to down Stark's Helicarrier. Ultron then initiates "Plan B" and kills Lindy, the Sentry's wife.

An enraged Sentry attacks Ultron once more. In an exchange of blows, Sentry is knocked away as Ares and Ant-Man proceed to infect Ultron with a virus intended to destroy it. Soon after, Sentry once again attacks Ultron, almost compromising the Avengers plan, nearly destroying Ultron by tearing its head off. Before he can finish, he is knocked away by Ms. Marvel. After Ultron's defeat he returns to the Watchtower to find his wife Lindy alive and well—having apparently revived her himself. Stark is later shocked when a terrified Lindy secretly requests that he find a way to either depower or kill her husband.

The Sentry then aids the team when they attack Latveria but ends up stuck in the past with Doctor Doom and Tony. He is amazed to see his former self and the Void. He angrily attacks Doctor Doom until Tony explains what has happened. The Sentry finds them and Stark sends Bob into the Baxter Building so that they can use Mister Fantastic's time machine; since all memory of his past actions were erased by his 'spell', he can do anything in the past and be sure that it won't impact the present. The Sentry gets to it, first having to deal with the Thing, whom he easily defeats. After he returns to present time along with Iron Man, he finds the rest of the Avengers engaged in battle with Doctor Doom. The Sentry quickly subdues Doom, who is then taken into S.H.I.E.L.D. custody.

World War Hulk

A confrontation between Iron Man and the Hulk ends up with Sentry's Watchtower being dropped straight down through Stark Tower/Avengers headquarters, destroying it. Mister Fantastic tries to build a machine that will cast a projection of the Sentry and recreates his calming aura, hoping that it would calm the Hulk, but the Hulk sees through the illusion.

Later in a confrontation between the Hulk and the Fantastic Four, Invisible Woman tries to call the real Sentry for help, but he does not answer the call and is sitting in his apartment watching television. The President of the United States tries to convince the Sentry to fight against his longtime friend the Hulk. The President stumbles over the pre-fed words of persuasion and tries to improvise a plea for help. The Sentry refuses.

After the Hulk turns Madison Square Garden into a gladiatorial arena and forces Illuminati members Mister Fantastic, Doctor Strange, Black Bolt, and Iron Man to fight one another, the military turns to the Sentry for help once again. The Sentry admits to his fear of his tremendous power mixed with his agoraphobia, stating,

After watching the events on TV and witnessing the Hulk apparently deciding, in Roman-style, to force Mister Fantastic to kill Iron Man, he leaves his home stating that, "It's time to play god".

The Sentry engages the Hulk who is now strong enough to destroy the Earth in his stampede, and unleashes his power. During the prolonged fight they both expend massive amounts of energy, nearly destroying Manhattan and disintegrating entire buildings. Sentry begins to lose control and Banner is forced to stop him before the energy Sentry releases consumes the city. After Banner delivers the final punch, the broken-faced Robert Reynolds thanks him before immediately collapsing before his feet, both reverting to human form.

Secret Invasion

When a Skrull spacecraft is discovered approaching Earth's atmosphere, the Mighty Avengers and New Avengers simultaneously head to its predicted crash area in the Savage Land. Inside are numerous superheroes dressed in their old costumes. As the Sentry fights one who looks like the Vision, it transforms into the Void, blaming the entire situation on the Sentry's hidden desires. Panicking, the Sentry flees. At the same time, a full-scale Skrull invasion begins, with the Watchtower where Lindy is being attacked by a Defenders-themed Super-Skrull. Before he can attack however, the Void appears, defends Lindy, and tells her that the Sentry can't handle the situation and that "Whatever he can't do, I can."

Dark Avengers

Sentry joins the Dark Avengers, Norman Osborn's personal team of Avengers, stating that Osborn is helping him in return after Osborn confides his own mental deficiency in Bob. Upon confronting the sorceress Morgan le Fay, the Sentry kills her only to have her come back to life and kill him in turn. After the Dark Avengers and Doctor Doom defeat Morgan, the team returns to New York City to find the Sentry reappears alive and well. After a terrorist attack by an Atlantean cell, Norman Osborn demands to speak to the Void and tells him to kill all the terrorists. The Sentry obliges but is seen with black eyes, indicating the return of the Void within the Sentry persona.

When anti-mutant riots break out in San Francisco, the Dark Avengers and H.A.M.M.E.R. move in to contain the situation. The Sentry watches as the riots are quelled, when the Dark Avengers team up with Norman's Dark X-Men against the X-Men, Emma Frost frees the Void from Sentry to take him off the battlefield. However, a sliver of the Void becomes contained in her mind, forcing Emma to shift into her diamond form to keep it contained. When Psylocke, Professor X, and Cyclops attempt to help Emma, she subsequently passes the Void sliver to Cyclops, whom the Void felt could be of more use to it. However, after years of dating and being married to the world's most powerful mutant telepath Jean Grey, Cyclops uses all that she taught him to successfully lock the Void inside an unbreakable psychic prison within his own mind.

When Sentry returns to Avengers Tower, Lindy shoots him because she fears his mindset, but he returns unharmed.

The Avengers are sent to investigate disappearances in Dinosaur, Colorado, and the Sentry is disintegrated when he approaches the area. The team find that Molecule Man, secluding himself, is responsible. Reece is losing touch with reality, and struggles to differentiate between the real and his creations. After the other Dark Avengers have been defeated, Osborn's aide Victoria Hand convinces Owen to restore reality in order to be left to his own devices. The Sentry returns mid-conversation and attacks Molecule Man only to be destroyed again. The Sentry reforms once more, but this time under the Void's influence. When a missile distracts Owen, Sentry takes control of Reece's body and tells Owen to restore reality or die. Reece seemingly obliges him, but is killed, which causes Bob/Void to believe they cannot die. Bob regains control of his body, but doesn't seem to recall killing Molecule Man. Ms. Marvel muses that the Scarlet Witch's reality-rewriting nervous breakdown was negligible in comparison to the threat posed by the Sentry losing control.

Sentry finds a runaway Noh-Varr in the streets of Manhattan. A battle breaks out and Sentry is distracted when a girl named Annie uses one of Noh-Varr's weapons. This creates enough time for Noh-Varr to get away.

After shooting Robert, apparently killing him, Lindy records Sentry's origins as a drug addict (previously revealed) and that he found the Professor's super serum by accident. After drinking the serum, Bob accidentally destroys the lab, killing his partner and two guards. As the Sentry, Bob lives a hero's life, forgetting about his past as a thief and addict, blaming them on "a boogeyman" that would become the Void. Lindy knew that Osborn's orders and replica of the serum were unlocking the Void again (Osborn calls him "his secret weapon"). When Bob recovers, his Void persona tries to kill Lindy while claiming to be Galactus, only to be stopped by the Sentry one, who tries to destroy the Void (and himself) in the Sun, only to survive and be convinced to return home.

Upon his return, the Void has now taken control of Robert's body. With black tendrils raining from the sky, the Void severely damages multiple buildings, killing some innocents. As the Iron Patriot, Osborn flies to the Void, claiming that he was breaking their "deal". Norman then has Bullseye murder Lindy.

Siege
During the 2010 storyline "Siege", when Osborn attacks the city of Asgard, Sentry, who serves Osborn, is pitted against the Avengers and others who rebel against Osborn. At Osborn's request, the Sentry destroyed Asgard. The Void then takes complete control, Sentry kills Ares much to the surprise of the combatants. After defeating the entire Avengers contingent, Sentry is eventually reverted to human form following Loki's revival of the Avengers using the stones of Norn. He then asks to be killed and following a brief outburst from the Void, his wish is granted by Thor. Thor respectfully carries Reynolds' body to the sun and cremates him there.

At a memorial service for Bob Reynolds, CLOC remarks he would rebuild the Watchtower (which vanished at the moment of Bob's apparent death) at an undisclosed location in preparation for the return of the Sentry, and that no one would be allowed to approach it. CLOC then gives Mister Fantastic the Sentry's diary and instructs him to read the final sentence of page nineteen, the contents of which Reynolds knew that only Mister Fantastic would understand. When asked about it, Mister Fantastic keeps the information to himself.

Horseman of Apocalypse
The Sentry is later resurrected by the Apocalypse Twins, who use a Celestial Death Seed to transform him into a member of their new Horsemen of Death. The Sentry claims he became trapped in the sun after his previous death at Thor's hands, dying and regenerating over and over again, and that the Void became 'bored' and has left him. He attacks the Avengers and initially captures Thor, but in a later confrontation is stymied by a sand worm controlled by Wasp. After the defeat of the Apocalypse Twins, the Sentry takes the dead body of the Celestial Executioner and offers to take it into deep space, far away from Earth. Wasp states that Sentry is trustworthy as he now views himself as the cosmic protector of humanity.

Marvel Legacy
It is revealed that Doctor Strange cured Robert from his condition and put the Void into a chamber of his Sanctum Sanctorum. When Loki became the new Sorcerer Supreme, Stephen asked the Sentry for help, now residing on the top of a mountain. Because of Loki's curiosity about the chamber, Stephen opens it, unleashing the Void. This causes the Void to possess Doctor Strange; however, with the replenishment of his magic by Loki and the help of the Sentry, Strange is freed by his influence and together they lock-in the Void again. An angry and distrustful Robert hits Strange, telling him to leave him alone.

It is later revealed that Doctor Strange created a device called the Confluctor that created a pocket dimension where Robert Reynolds can go to once every 24 hours to be the Sentry and fight the Void with Scout and Watchdog. This will prevent him from turning into the Void in the real world. Robert confides in Billy Turner (formerly The Scout) about the pocket dimension. Unbeknownst to him, Billy devises a plot with one of Sentry's oldest enemies Cranio to duplicate the Sentry formula and trap Robert Reynolds in the pocket dimension, so Cranio can rule there and Billy will be the new Sentry. The plan is foiled when S.H.I.E.L.D. and Iron Man arrest Robert Reynolds for not checking in on his "parole", but he unleashes the Sentry and escapes. Billy takes the Sentry formula and battles Reynolds. They are evenly matched until Reynolds while in his subconscious thoughts decides to stop fighting the Void and become one with him. The newly-merged Sentry easily kills Billy, then removes Cranio from the pocket dimension. Iron Man returns with the Avengers, but they are unable to stop the new Sentry. As Reynolds prepares to leave, Iron Man asks if they're supposed to simply trust he'll do the right thing from now on. Reynolds replies "You don't have a choice" and flies off into space.

During the "King in Black" storyline, Sentry returns in his golden appearance and has been called by the Avengers to help fight Knull. He attempts to fly Knull into space, as he had done to Carnage, only for Knull to break free and tear Sentry in half instead, absorbing the Void emerging from Sentry's body, into his own. Valkyrie Jane Foster then takes Robert’s soul to Valhalla.

The Sentry's corpse is later reassembled and used by Director None and the Blasphemy Cartel to house 100 million screaming ghosts intent on destroying Stephen and Clea Strange, but the pair break the spell keeping the ghosts contained, and the Sentry's corpse explodes from the force of the ghosts' release.

Powers and abilities

Sentry 
The Sentry's powers ostensibly derive from the Super-Soldier Serum that "moves his molecules an instant ahead of the current timeline." This was designed to be a hundred thousand times stronger than the original used on Captain America, and was modified by Weapon X. However, in The Age of the Sentry miniseries, it is suggested that Sentry is a sentient life force, a refugee from another universe who attempted to break through to another one for its new home, and that this was merely accommodated by the serum.

Although the character's exact abilities and their limits are unknown and also said to be omnipotent, he has shown a small portion of his powers by lifting a Helicarrier (with assistance from Ms. Marvel and Wonder Man); preventing the Celestial Exitar from crushing the Earth by lifting his foot (with the help of an empowered Rogue) although later seen carrying it alone; also seen effortlessly toying with Thor, sending him flying with punches that produced shock waves felt around the planet. He dismembered Carnage with little effort. Sentry is considered by the mutant Emma Frost to be one of the best telepaths on Earth 616. He is somehow resistant to Rogue's mutate touch. Effortlessly defeating and breaking the handle of the axe of Terrax, a herald of Galactus shown as powerful enough to slice planets in half; severely pummeling and nearly tearing apart the female Ultron; and easily shattering shields of Doctor Doom. During the Sentry's initial miniseries, Spider-Man, in a moment of reflection, recalls that the Sentry fought and stalemated Galactus at one point.

He generally holds back his powers, greatly restraining his full might. On occasion, he has unleashed them, showing the true magnitude of his abilities and strength. On some of these occasions, he overloaded the abilities of the Absorbing Man; and fought an enraged Hulk for a prolonged period of time until both fighters reverted to their human forms, whereupon Reynolds was knocked unconscious by Banner. He possesses superhuman speed, making him easily able to evade or catch bullets; and through flight he can travel to the sun and back in a matter of minutes. The Sentry is also apparently invulnerable: Spider-Woman's venom blasts, capable of killing even superhumans at full power, have no effect upon him. Nick Fury has stated that S.H.I.E.L.D. has not yet found a way to kill the Sentry. Iron Man's scanners have found no physical weaknesses in his body.

The Sentry also has superhumanly acute senses. He once told an opponent that he could see his nerve centers and on another occasion said he can hear a heartbeat of a butterfly in Africa while he's in the US. He can emit light, which can be used for a pacifying effect. He possesses an ability to absorb energy from any matter/source which provides him limitless energy. Sentry possesses tremendous powers of energy projection, from both his hands and eyes, capable of harming even the Hulk (in his Green Scar incarnation), who has withstood the equivalent of solar flares unharmed, and also released planet-destroying energy against Genis-Vell. The Sentry has also at times demonstrated the ability to instantly teleport himself away in a blinding flash of light.

He was once able to implant his memories inside another person's mind (he also implanted his thoughts on the comic's writer's mind for them to be written in comics), he uses his vast mental powers to maintain control even while in an uneven state caused by his mental illness. After Ultron murdered his wife, Sentry was able to resurrect her by simply touching her.

The Sentry has demonstrated the ability to recreate himself after bodily destruction, up to and including total molecular destruction within seconds (he once tried to commit suicide by flying into the heart of the sun). Dialogue between Reynolds and the Void suggests that this particular capability is automatic, involuntary, and beyond the control of either Reynolds or the Void.

He eventually found out that all his powers apparently derive from abilities similar to those of the virtually omnipotent Molecule Man, which he uses to take control of the latter's body and resurrect himself multiple times after seemingly being annihilated.

During a conversation between Lindy, CLOC, and the Void, it is hinted that the Sentry's powers may come from a cosmic source, or possibly even from the Judeo-Christian God. Lindy believed that his powers were of "maybe Biblical proportions" and theorized that modern-day superheroes were conduits through which such higher power was now being channeled. When Steve Rogers demands that Norman Osborn tell him how the heroes are to stop the Void, Osborn says (albeit possibly figuratively) that the Void was the 'Angel of Death'; an earlier Biblical flashback also revealed that the being that brought the divine plagues down on Egypt was apparently similar in appearance to the Void, who, millennia later, claims to the Sentry when attacking New York that doing so is 'God's way'.

As Sentry's molecules are ahead of the current timeline, this states that he simultaneously exists in the future, present and past altogether. His long time foe Cranio stated that Time bends for Sentry, and every situation that happens all works in his favor, sort of Probability manipulation but in his case it's Time.

Void
Robert Reynolds projects an entity as a dark side effect of his powers. It has been claimed that for every benevolent act the Sentry performs, the Void corresponds with attempting an act of malevolence. He was formerly unaware that the Void was a false personality, but has since been informed otherwise. In the 2009 storyline "Utopia", it was temporarily separated from his being, with a "shard" of its essence placed within Emma Frost which is later transferred to Scott Summers and currently resides locked away in his mind.

Several reasons for the existence of the Void have been given: the innate division between good and evil in any nominally normal person; a "mind virus" put into place by the mutant Mastermind by order of the crazed General; the idea that the Void is in fact the true personality of Rob Reynolds and the Sentry is the false one; as mentioned above, the result of covering up his past; and, according to Norman Osborn the Sentry's superhumanity eroded his humanity, leading to a 'void' in his life. During the Siege storyline, the Void exhibits a more demonic form, capable of nearly slaughtering Thor, bringing down the entire city of Asgard, and striking down every immortal and mortal hero set against it simultaneously, killing the Norn Stone-powered Loki in seconds, and even tearing the god of war, Ares, in half. Norman Osborn claims that it is the Angel of Death, tying into an earlier prelude which showed the Void's presence in biblical times.

The Void possesses the ability to shape-shift, and through its control over the weather and darkness it can create destructive storms and deadly "infini-tendrils" that attack the mind. Victims impaled on the tendrils experience traumatic visions of the past, present, and future. Its regular appearance varies between a shadowy, trench-coat-wearing villain to a massive hurricane of darkness. It can also assume powers dependent on shape, like a flame form that breathes fire, alternately an armored monster with superstrength and toughness. It is at its strongest during the night and in the Negative Zone (which is also Blue Marvel's source of his strength & power), where it has shown itself capable of easily overpowering the Hulk by breaking every single bone in his body in moments. Coincidentally, Sentry is at his weakest in the Negative Zone. A mere physical assault required much effort to hold off, even with the combined force fields of Iron Man, Doctor Strange, and the Invisible Woman, while the united forces of the New Avengers, Fantastic Four, X-Men, Inhumans, Illuminati, and heavily armed S.H.I.E.L.D. agents simultaneously attacked it.

Team
Joining Sentry to take on the Void are his sidekick, Scout, his loyal canine companion Watchdog and his equal, Sentress, a woman named Jenny.

Scout
Billy Turner is the loyal sidekick and partner of the Sentry. After the Sentry made the entire world forget of his existence with the help of Mister Fantastic and Doctor Strange in order to stop the Void, Billy went on to live a normal life. He lived with his mother and worked at a fast food restaurant. When the Sentry first re-emerged, Billy's memories of his life as Scout returned. He suited up on his old costume and joined the Sentry and numerous other heroes at the Statue of Liberty to take a stand against the Void. When the Sentry saw himself forced to return to obscurity, Billy returned again to his normal life.

Scout's powers are similar to Sentry's (superhuman strength, speed, and stamina; regenerative healing; flight; etc.) and were also obtained by drinking the super serum.

Watchdog
Watchdog is a super-powered Welsh Corgi. He takes verbal orders from the Sentry. The orders are given by the prefix Watchdog, directly followed by commands, such as, Guard, Stay, etc. Watchdog always obeys.

Reception

Accolades 

 In 2015, Entertainment Weekly ranked Sentry 44th in their "Let's rank every Avenger ever" list.
 In 2017, CBR.com ranked Sentry 2nd in their "15 Most Overpowered Avengers" list.
 In 2017, Den of Geek ranked Sentry 10th in their "Guardians of the Galaxy 3: 50 Marvel Characters We Want to See" list.
 In 2018, CBR.com ranked Sentry 4th in their "25 Fastest Characters In The Marvel Universe" list.
 In 2021, Collider ranked Sentry 7th in their "20 Most Powerful Marvel Characters" list.
 In 2021, CBR.com ranked Sentry 1st in their "Marvel: The 10 Strongest Male Avengers" list. 
 In 2022, Screen Rant included Sentry in their "10 Most Powerful Avengers In Marvel Comics" list and in their "X-Men: 10 Most Powerful Horsemen Of Apocalypse" list.
 In 2022, Sportskeeda ranked Sentry 5th in their "10 most overpowered superheroes in the Marvel Universe" list.
 In 2022, CBR.com ranked Sentry 1st in their "8 Fastest Avengers" list and  2nd in their "10 Scariest Avengers" list.

Literary reception

Volumes

Sentry - 2000 
According to Diamond Comic Distributors, Sentry #1 was the 31st best selling comic book in July 2000.

David Harth of CBR.com ranked the Sentry comic book series 10th in their "10 Best Things About Marvel Comics From The 2000s," writing, "The Sentry told the story of the forgotten hero, a story about a man with too much power wrestling with his own demons and hidden history as one of Marvel's greatest superheroes. It was a great way to kick off the decade for the publisher." Rosie Knight of Nerdist included the Sentry comic book series in their "8 Must-Read Marvel Knights Stories," asserting, "This meta-text on superheroes from The Inhumans‘ Jae Lee and Paul Jenkins is one of the more unique takes that Marvel Knights had to offer, focusing on a middle aged man named Bob Reynolds who one day remembers he is in fact a hero named Sentry. This miniseries follows Bob as he attempts to warn other Marvel characters about the return of his foe, whilst also figuring out why no one can remember his superhero alter-ego. If you’re not aware of the Sentry, then the big reveal here will be a real gut punch as Lee and Jenkins create a seminal Sentry story in just five issues."

Sentry - 2005 
According to Diamond Comic Distributors, Sentry #1 was the 17th best selling comic book in September 2005. Sentry #2 was the 30th best selling comic book in October 2005.

Sentry - 2018 
According to Diamond Comic Distributors, Sentry #1 was the 63rd best selling comic book in June 2018.

Joshua Davison of Bleeding Cool wrote, "Sentry #1 is another excellent self-conscious superhero title from Jeff Lemire, and it does so without going fully meta, which is an overused tactic in modern comics. The story is compelling, and Bob Reynolds is made to be an interesting character to follow. This one gets a recommendation. Give it a read." Adam Barnhardt of Comicbook.com gave Sentry #1 a grade of 5 out of 5, saying, "Lemire's ability to write the internal conflicts his protagonists face is second to none and after his iconic run on Moon Knight, a comic with Robert Reynolds was a long time coming. He's able to craft tales where the readers struggle to separate fact and fiction, yet everything eventually falls into place, and that's exactly the type of writer a character like Robert Reynolds needs. Lemire and The Sentry are a match made in heaven."

Other versions

Age of Apocalypse
A zombie Sentry appears as a member of the Black Legion in the Age of Apocalypse reality.

House of M
After Wanda Maximoff changes the world in House of M #1, Robert Reynolds is seen briefly with Doctor Strange in a therapy session. He tells Strange about a dream in which he sees an immense darkness (the Void) coming down on him.

Marvel Zombies
A version of the Sentry is responsible for the zombie outbreak depicted in Ultimate Fantastic Four and Marvel Zombies. A costumed hero resembling the Sentry appears from another universe, looking for food. The Avengers attempt to intercept him, and are immediately infected. The zombie virus rapidly spreads to nearly every super-powered character in that world. The costumed hero responsible for the outbreak is never called by name, and is only distinguishable by his outfit. What happens to him after his initial contact with this universe is unknown.

In Marvel Zombies vs. The Army of Darkness, it is revealed that the zombie Sentry was undead in the afterlife, eating everyone that came into the "light" and knocking Ash into the not yet infected world of superheroes. Unfortunately, the Sentry finds its way through the same portal and infects the Avengers who came to tackle him in the first place. He joins them in decimating the city and consuming civilians. However, he is not seen after

In Marvel Zombies Return, it is revealed that the Sentry's infection and universal travel is a predestination paradox. When the Giant-Man of the Marvel Zombies universe comes to a past version of the Marvel Universe, he infects the Hulk, who then infects the Sentry. At the conclusion of the story, Sentry is sent through the multiverse by that Earth's version of Uatu the Watcher and infects the Avengers, setting off the entire series of events while 'containing' the infection between these two universes so that it will essentially 'devour itself'. In the one-shot Marvel Zombies: Evil Evolution, Zombie Reed Richards speculates that a dimensional teleporter he was testing may have pulled the Sentry from his reality, though whether this was from the Gates of Heaven or was the other end of Uatu's teleporter is not revealed.

Age of Sentry
This version of Sentry is mostly identical to the mainstream counterpart, becoming a hero and battling villains alongside Scout, Watchdog and the Sentress and falling in love with Lindy Lee. Afterwards, the villainous brain-like alien Gorax was able to take away the powers of Sentry, resulting in Robert and Lindy going back in time and regaining his powers. Then, the two villains known as Phineas Mason and the Mad Thinker started posing as two film-makers who were using their machinery to drain Sentry's power which ultimately failed.

Deadpool: Killustrated
In Deadpool: Killustrated, the corpse of a Sentry is seen along with other deceased heroes after being killed by Dreadpool.

What If?
The Sentry has appeared in some issues of What If:

 In What If the Skrulls succeeded in their Secret Invasion?, Sentry is allied with the Skrulls, along with the Thunderbolts, and fights the Avengers Alliance For Freedom when the Skrulls invade Wakanda after Marvel Boy destroys a Conversion Temple with a suicide attack. During the battle against the Avengers Alliance, Sentry destroys the vaccine cannon built for spreading a modified Legacy virus around the planet, which was meant to reverse human conversion into Skrulls. After the destruction of the cannon, Sentry continues fighting Thor, who gains the upper hand and regretfully declares Sentry too dangerous to let live. Thor kills Sentry by snapping his neck.
 In What If Osborn Won Siege?, Sentry kills Ares prior to the assault on Asgard and as a result is able to focus on the other heroes present. Sentry kills most of the heroes, allowing the Dark Avengers to murder the rest. Afterwards, a cabal led by Dr. Doom confronts Sentry with the knowledge that Bullseye killed his wife Lindy in the hopes that Sentry will turn on Osborn. However, it sends Sentry over the edge and he allows the Void to take complete control. As the Void, he kills the Cabal, Bullseye, Osborn and eventually destroys the Earth, with foreshadowing that he would begin moving through the universe wreaking destruction.

In other media

Video games
 The Sentry appears in the Nintendo DS version of Marvel: Ultimate Alliance 2, voiced by Nolan North.
 The Sentry is a playable character in Marvel Super Hero Squad Online, voiced by Charlie Adler.
 The Sentry / The Void is a playable character in Marvel: Contest of Champions.
 The Sentry is a playable character in Marvel Puzzle Quest.
 The Sentry appears in Lego Marvel's Avengers.
 The Sentry is a playable character in Marvel Future Fight.
 The Sentry appears in the digital collectible card game Marvel Snap.

Toys
 Marvel Legends released Sentry (featuring bearded and non bearded variants) in the Giant Man Series (Wal-Mart exclusive) in and in 2015 Marvel released Sentry in the Avengers Infinite Series. In 2022, Hasbro released a new Sentry as a Walgreens exclusive in the US, a GameStop exclusive in Canada, and a fan-channel exclusive in the United Kingdom.

Music
 The lyrics of the song "A Million Exploding Suns" by Horse the Band draw on the duality of the Sentry's lifestyle.
 Seth Marton, better known as Seth Sentry, is an Australian rapper from Victoria, Australia whose stagename is a reference to Sentry, as he was Marton's favorite superhero growing up.

Collected editions

See also

 Metafiction

References

External links
 Sentry (Robert Reynolds) at Marvel.com
 
 
 
 
 Sentry at Comic Vine

2000 comics debuts
Avengers (comics) characters
Characters created by Paul Jenkins (writer)
Comics characters introduced in 2000
Fictional characters from New York (state)
Fictional characters who can manipulate light
Fictional characters who can manipulate darkness or shadows
Fictional characters who can turn intangible
Fictional characters with dissociative identity disorder
Fictional characters with immortality
Fictional characters with superhuman durability or invulnerability
Fictional characters with superhuman senses
Fictional drug addicts
Fictional murderers
Marvel Comics characters who can move at superhuman speeds
Marvel Comics characters with accelerated healing
Marvel Comics characters with superhuman strength
Marvel Comics characters who are shapeshifters
Marvel Comics male superheroes
Marvel Comics characters who have mental powers
Marvel Comics telekinetics
Marvel Comics telepaths
Merged fictional characters
S.H.I.E.L.D. agents
Marvel Comics mutates